Panjab Airport  is a public use airport located near Panjab, Bamyan, Afghanistan.

See also
List of airports in Afghanistan

References

External links 
 Airport record for Panjab Airport at Landings.com.

Airports in Afghanistan
Bamyan Province